Kolonia Chorzew  is a village in the administrative district of Gmina Kiełczygłów, within Pajęczno County, Łódź Voivodeship, in central Poland.

The village has a population of 280.

References

Kolonia Chorzew